Jacques Rémy (born 3 March 1972 in Denain) is a French soccer striker who is currently retired after he played for Municipal Liberia in Costa Rica.

Whilst at Strasbourg Rémy played as a substitute in the 2001 Coupe de France Final in which they beat Amiens SC on penalties.

References

External links
 Profile  at Nacion.com 
 

1972 births
Living people
People from Denain
French footballers
FC Martigues players
Stade Malherbe Caen players
RC Strasbourg Alsace players
FC Rouen players
FC Istres players
Grenoble Foot 38 players
French expatriate footballers
Expatriate footballers in Costa Rica
Pau FC players
SO Cassis Carnoux players
US Marseille Endoume players
Association football forwards
Sportspeople from Nord (French department)
French expatriate sportspeople in Costa Rica
Footballers from Hauts-de-France